These road signs are used in France, and can also be found in some overseas territories of France.

Warning signs

Priority signs

Regulatory signs

Information signs

Service signs

Railway signs

Temporary signs

References

France